This is a list of notable people who have converted to Islam after a period where they claimed to be atheistic or non-theistic.

See also
 List of converts to Islam

References

 
Islam